James Christian Shaffer (born June 6, 1970), also known by his stage name "Munky", is an American musician best known as co-founder and guitarist of the nu metal band Korn. 

Shaffer set up the side-project band Fear and the Nervous System in 2008 and is also the founder of Emotional Syphon Recordings, who have signed acts like Monster in the Machine and Droid.

Shaffer was ranked at No. 26 of Guitar World's 100 Greatest Heavy Metal Guitarists of All Time. Shaffer's work with Korn has resulted in over 40 million albums sold.

Early life
Shaffer was born June 6, 1970, in Rosedale, California. He was adopted by his parents as an infant, along with two other siblings. Shaffer and the other members of Korn grew up in an agricultural town of Bakersfield, California, two hours north of Los Angeles. When trying to sneak out to a party, the tip of one of his fingers was severed by the chain on his three-wheeler, and, as part of his rehabilitation, Shaffer picked up a guitar. During high school, Shaffer met fellow guitarist Brian Welch and the two would often jam together.

Musical career

Early musical career
Shaffer, along with fellow future Korn members, David Silveria and Reginald Arvizu formed a band called L.A.P.D. with singer Richard Morill. When the band moved from Bakersfield, California to Los Angeles, Silveria dropped out of high school and Shaffer stayed in Bakersfield. When Shaffer reunited with the band, they found a manager and released an EP entitled Love and Peace Dude in 1989 through Triple X Records. L.A.P.D. released their first full-length studio album on May 3, 1991, which consisted of eleven tracks. The album was entitled Who's Laughing Now. After releasing two albums, L.A.P.D. broke up. They were also briefly known as Creep, recording a demo with a singer named Corey until Shaffer, Arvizu, and Silveria enlisted Brian Welch and Jonathan Davis to form the band that went on to become Korn.

Korn (1993–present)

When thinking of a band name, someone suggested "corn", but the band rejected that name, so Shaffer had the idea to spell the name with both a "K" instead of a "C", and a backwards "R", so the band's name would appear as "KoЯn". The idea of using a backwards "R" came from the logo of toy retailer Toys R Us, for which many of the band members had previously worked.

On February 22, 2005, Brian "Head" Welch left the band. Shaffer accepted his friend's choice and the two remained on good terms. When drummer David Silveria left the band, Munky said in an interview that he had a strong friendship with him and was very sad to hear that he had to leave.

On an interview about Welch's departure, Shaffer said he felt pressure because they were always working together, writing songs, and creating albums. But when Welch left, he had to write all the guitar parts into one part, so Korn could play live, and he continued to play like that until Korn got a backing guitarist. Welch officially returned to the band on May 2, 2013, to work on the album The Paradigm Shift that was released in October 2013.

Fear and the Nervous System (2008–present)

On March 4, 2008, it was announced that Shaffer would be releasing a solo record on August 8, 2008, with his solo band Fear and The Nervous System which would feature Munky doing vocals and guitars, Brooks Wackerman of Bad Religion (who also performed on Korn's eighth album) on drums, Leopold Ross on guitars and programming, Bill Gould of Faith No More fame, and Zac Baird (Korn's keyboardist) on keyboards and programming. The record would be produced by Munky and Ross Robinson.  Guitarist and friend Wes Borland originally recorded guitars for two songs on the album but they would not make the final cut. Borland also created cover art that would still be used on the album. The band's debut album was originally due out August 8, 2008, but was pushed back multiple times until its release in 2011.

On Modlife in October 2009 (Korn.com), Shaffer explained that he would not be doing vocals on the Fear and the Nervous System album because he is not "very good at singing." It was later announced that Steve Krolikowski of Repeater would be handling vocal duties.

Emotional Syphon Recordings (2006–present)
In 2006, Shaffer founded Emotional Syphon Records to give daring and diverse bands a chance to be heard. The first bands to be signed were Droid and Monster In The Machine, however Shaffer says he does not want to limit himself to only releasing metal acts but to create a multi-genre label.

Personal life
On January 15, 2000, Shaffer married Stephanie Roush. Together, they had a daughter, Carmella Star Shaffer (born on June 23, 2001). In 2004, Shaffer and Roush got divorced. Shaffer then started to date the Albanian American actress and model Evis Xheneti in 2005. They were married on January 2, 2012, in Paris, France. They have three children together: D'Angelo DraXon Shaffer (born on November 7, 2012), Rocky Rebel Shaffer (born on August 20, 2015), and Heart Hera Shaffer (Born on August 7, 2019).

Equipment

Shaffer predominantly uses Ibanez guitars, most often his signature model the Ibanez Apex 7-string model and Mesa Boogie Triple Rectifier & Diezel guitar amplifier. Like Head, he uses many pedals and effects to shape the distinct Korn sound. Munky describes his live pedal board as a "spaceship" because of the large, diverse quantity of effects he uses.

Discography

With L.A.P.D.
1989 – Love and Peace, Dude
1991 – Who's Laughing Now
1997 – L.A.P.D (Compilation)

With Korn
1994 – Korn
1996 – Life Is Peachy
1998 – Follow the Leader
1999 – Issues
2002 – Untouchables
2003 – Take a Look in the Mirror
2005 – See You on the Other Side
2007 – Untitled album
2010 – Korn III: Remember Who You Are
2011 – The Path of Totality
2013 – The Paradigm Shift
2016 - The Serenity of Suffering
2019 - The Nothing
2022 - Requiem
With Fear and the Nervous System
2012 – Fear and the Nervous System
With $UICIDEBOY$ x Travis Barker
2019 – ''Live Fast, Die Whenever

References

External links

Bakotopia interview with James 'Munky' Shaffer
"James 'Munky' Shaffer's 2002 Korn Guitar Rig". GuitarGeek.Com

1970 births
Alternative metal guitarists
Alternative metal musicians
American experimental guitarists
American heavy metal guitarists
American industrial musicians
American male guitarists
American people of German descent
Record producers from California
Eight-string guitarists
Guitarists from California
Korn members
Lead guitarists
Living people
Male guitarists
Musicians from Bakersfield, California
Rhythm guitarists
Seven-string guitarists
Virgin Records artists
Fear and the Nervous System members